The 1994 Reading Borough Council election was held on 5 May 1994, at the same time as other local elections across England and Scotland. Sixteen of the 45 seats on Reading Borough Council were up for election, being the usual third of the council (15 seats) plus a by-election in Battle ward, where Labour councillor David Booth had resigned. Prior to the election there had been one independent "Thames Conservative" councillor, Hamza Fuad, who had been elected as a Conservative, but split from the party in 1990. He did not stand for re-election in 1994. Labour retained its majority on the council.

Results

Ward results
The results in each ward were as follows (candidates with an asterisk* were the previous incumbent standing for re-election):

By-elections 19941995

The Kentwood ward by-election in 1994 was triggered by the death of Liberal Democrat councillor George Ford, just 22 days after he had been appointed mayor of Reading.

References

1994 English local elections
1994